Sheraton Centre may refer to:
 Le Centre Sheraton Montreal Hotel
 Sheraton Centre Toronto Hotel
 Sheraton Centre (Barbados)